The Ministry of Internal Affairs (Montenegrin: Ministarstvo Unutrašnjih Poslova Crne Gore / Министарство унутрашњих послова) is a Ministry in the Government of Montenegro, tasked with oversight and strategic planning of law enforcement apparatus in Montenegro, including budgetary oversight and internal affairs, as well as direct control over disaster relief and emergency situations management, maintaining citizen, vehicle and firearms databases, issuance of ID cards, passports, driving and firearms licences. It also has certain jurisdiction over border security management, and operates police aviation unit.

History
Historically, Ministry was the main arm of law enforcement and state intelligence. However, in 2005 the intelligence arm split and became and independent agency, while law enforcement became fully operationally independent, as Police Administration.

Ministers of Internal Affairs, since 1991

External links
Official Website

Internal Affairs
Montenegro